Mohammad Abdus Sattar (1 March 1925 – 5 June 2009), known as M. A. Sattar (এম এ সাত্তার), was a prominent Bangladeshi business magnate and politician. He was the founding Chairman and Managing Director of Sattar & Company Ltd., Sattar Jute Mills Ltd., Hasna Shipbuilding & Navigation Ltd., and Rangpur Industries Ltd. 
In the 1980s, Sattar held several cabinet ministry positions, elected as a Member of Parliament twice, and was Chief Whip in President Ershad's Government from 1988 to 1990.

Early life and education
Sattar was born on March 1, 1925, to Tofazzal Hossain and Hasna, a Bengali Muslim family in Durgapur, Rangpur, Bengal Presidency, British India (now Bangladesh). After completing his education in Rangpur and Kolkata, he entered the jute trade.

East Pakistan period

Business career
Sattar founded Sattar Jute Mills Ltd. in 1948 on 262 acres of land on the banks of the Shitalakshya River in Narayanganj. Over 10 thousand workers used to work in Sattar Jute Mills. 

In 1963-64, he was elected the first Bengali Chairman of the then Pakistan Jute Association (PJA), and he was re-elected in 1965 and 1967. Sattar represented PJA at a number of conferences internationally and advocated for the interests of the Pakistan jute industry. 

He also held the positions of Vice-Chairman and Chairman of Pakistan Jute Mills Association (PJMA).

Over the years, he expanded his business to other industries and founded Sattar & Company Ltd., Hasna Shipbuilding & Navigation Ltd., Rangpur Industries Ltd., and Tobacco Industries Ltd.

Sattar was made Director of Australasia Bank Ltd. and Great Eastern Insurance Co.

During this period, Sattar was commonly listed as one of the wealthiest families in East Pakistan, ranked tenth, with five institutions and assets worth 30 million rupees (equivalent to $6.3 million USD in 1970).

Bangladesh Liberation war (1971)

Sattar, as one of the few Bengali industrialists and due to his close association with Sheikh Mujibur Rahman, was targeted for elimination during Operation Searchlight. On March 27, 1971, Pakistani soldiers entered his home "Rangpur House Massdair" in Narayanganj and immediately shot and killed his eldest son, Taufique Sattar (তৌফিক সাত্তার), and his friend Jalal Ahmed (জালাল আহমেদ). The soldiers ceased their attack when they saw a coveted civil award of Pakistan that had been given to Sattar for his contributions to the economy of Pakistan, thereby sparing his life along with the rest of his family.

Post-independence activities

After the Independence of Bangladesh, the Bangladeshi government added socialism to the constitution of Bangladesh and nationalized most industries, which resulted in Sattar losing ownership of his industries, including Sattar Jute Mills. The Jute Mills were placed under the Bangladesh Jute Mills Corporation.

Sattar organized Bangladeshi jute mill owners and formed an association to struggle for the return of the nationalized jute and cotton mills to their former Bengali owners, which was achieved in 1982.

During this nationalization period, most industries suffered devastating losses due to rising costs, the devaluation of the taka, and internal corruption. The Jute industry never recovered and incurred heavy operating losses throughout the coming decades. It was during this time Sattar entered politics.

Political career
 

In 1983, he was appointed as an Adviser to President Hussain Muhammad Ershad with the rank and status of a cabinet minister. 

From July 1985 to April 1986, he served as the Jute Minister in the cabinet of President Ershad. Sattar introduced several measures to enhance the jute industry in Bangladesh, which included modernization of jute mills, promoting jute-based industries, and diversifying jute products. During his term, he focused on developing new markets for jute goods and increased the country's jute exports. Sattar worked to improve the production and export of jute. He emphasized expanding the jute industry and increasing the use of jute in various sectors. He then went on to serve as the Minister of Labor and Manpower from July 1986 to March 1987.

He was elected twice as a Jatiya Party candidate to represent the Narayanganj-4 constituency in Parliament, first in 1986 and then again in 1988.  During his second term, he held the position of Chief Whip for the Jatiya Party in the 4th Jatiya Sangsad from 1988 to 1990. As Chief Whip, Sattar was responsible for ensuring discipline among members of the ruling party and their attendance in parliamentary sessions. He played a significant part in maintaining the party's discipline and attendance in the Parliament, particularly during crucial voting sessions. He worked to enhance the Bangladesh Jatiya Party's influence in Parliament and strengthen its alliances with other political parties.

In the 1991 Bangladeshi general election, Sattar ran for office once more but did not succeed, receiving 11.7% of the votes.

Personal life

M.A. Sattar was involved in social and cultural activities in his local community, and engaged in philanthropic activities. He was a patron of several educational institutions and social organizations in his constituency. In 1967, Sattar was elected as the first Bengali president of Narayanganj Club. 

In 1980, Sattar established a secondary school named Sattar Jute Mills Model High School in Rupganj, Narayanganj. In the beginning it was established for the children of officials and workers working in the jute mills, but over time the children of local residents also got the opportunity to read in this school. The school has been developed further with a 4-storey modern building and a vast playground by the new landlords.
He also established a mosque for prayer near the school.

To pay off the debts of the jute mills, he had to sell most of his assets throughout the years. In 2005, he sold Sattar Jute Mills, including the full-fledged factory buildings, warehouses, and remaining 55 acres with a riverfront to industrialist Anisur Rahman Sinha, the owner of the Sinha Group.

M.A Sattar passed away on June 5th, 2009, at the age of 84.

References

Jatiya Party politicians
Jatiya Party (Ershad) politicians
3rd Jatiya Sangsad members
4th Jatiya Sangsad members
Bengali Muslims
20th-century Bengalis
20th-century Muslims
Bangladeshi businesspeople
20th-century Bangladeshi businesspeople
20th-century Pakistani businesspeople
Bangladeshi Muslims
1925 births
2009 deaths
Bangladeshi chairpersons of corporations
Bangladeshi bankers
Textiles and Jute ministers of Bangladesh